Phlebocarya filifolia is a plant in the Haemodoraceae family, native to Western Australia.

Description 
Phlebocarya filifolia has flat leaves (occasionally terete). The leaf blade is  25-40 cm by  0.6-1.8 mm. The leaf margins are fringed but sometimes only on the apical or basal part. The  sheath is hairy. The flower head can be slightly shorter to considerably longer than the leaves. The scape, the bracts and the pedicels are glabrous. The style is simple and there is one stigma.

It flowers from October to December, and is found on sandy soils in shrublands and eucalypt woodlands.

Taxonomy 
The plant was first described as Phlebocarya ciliata var filifolia by Ferdinand von Mueller in 1873, but later in 1873 George Bentham erected it to  the species Phlebocarya filifolia.

Etymology 
The species epithet, filifolia, is an adjective derived from the Latin, filum ("thread) and folium ("leaf") and thus describes the plant as having  thread-like leaves.

References

External links
Phlebocarya filifolia occurrence data from Australasian Virtual Herbarium

Flora of Western Australia
Haemodoraceae
Taxa named by Ferdinand von Mueller